Liu Chan (fl. 319–329 CE) was a Chinese nobleman from Han Zhao. He was created Prince of Taiyuan in 319.

History
Liu Chan was the son of Former Zhao emperor Liu Yao (died 329) and his wife Empress Xianwen from Taishan Commandery. In 319 his father the emperor moved the capital of Former Zhao from Pingyang to Chang'an, and created his concubine and Liu Chan's mother Yang Xianrong as his empress, while Liu Chan's brother Liu Xi became the crown prince. Further, another brother of his, also named Liu Xi, received the title of Prince of Changli, whereas Liu Chan was named Prince of Taiyuan. What happened to him after demise of Former Zhao (329) is unknown.

References

4th-century Chinese people
Chinese princes
Former Zhao people
Xiongnu